The 1985 SMU Mustangs football team represented Southern Methodist University (SMU) as a member of the Southwest Conference (SWC) during the 1985 NCAA Division I-A football season. Led by fourth-year head coach Bobby Collins, the Mustangs compiled an overall record 6–5 with a mark of 5–3 in conference play, placing fourth in the SWC.

Schedule

References

SMU
SMU Mustangs football seasons
SMU Mustangs football